City of Auckland was a New Zealand electorate formed for the election of 1853. It covered the core of Auckland during the early days of New Zealand democracy, when the city was small enough to be covered by two or three seats. It existed from 1853 to 1860, and from 1890 to 1905.

Population centres
The City of Auckland electorate was one of the original electorates, and was used in the country's first election. It covered a territory roughly corresponding to the central business district of the city today, and was surrounded by another electorate called Auckland Suburbs. As the city was growing rapidly, however, the electorate did not last long – in the 1860 election, it was divided into Auckland East and Auckland West.

At the 1890 election, however, the total number of seats was reduced. This necessitated the re-creation of a seat to cover all of inner Auckland. This was accomplished by merging most of Auckland Central, Auckland West, Auckland North and Ponsonby, and taking a considerable amount of Parnell. In the 1893 election, the seat absorbed most of Newton electorate, but lost some of its southern territories to the remnants of Parnell. In 1902 election, Grey Lynn was split away into its own electorate. In the 1905 election, the remainder of the electorate was split in three, becoming Auckland Central, Auckland East, and Auckland West.

History
The  was contested by seven candidates. John Shera, Thomas Thompson and William Lee Rees received 2006, 1860 and 1761 votes, respectively, and were elected. Adam Porter, William Joseph Napier, James Wallis and Harry Farnall received 1501, 1319, 748 and 262 votes, respectively, and were unsuccessful.

Members of Parliament
Key

Election results

1902 election

1900 by-election

1899 election

1896 election

1895 by-election

1893 election

1893 by-election

1890 election

1853 election

 
 
 
 
 
 
 
 

Table footnotes:

References

Historical electorates of New Zealand
1853 establishments in New Zealand
Politics of the Auckland Region
1905 disestablishments in New Zealand
1890 establishments in New Zealand
1860 disestablishments in New Zealand